= Shambhu Shahi =

Nepalese dancer and choreographer

- शम्भु शाही
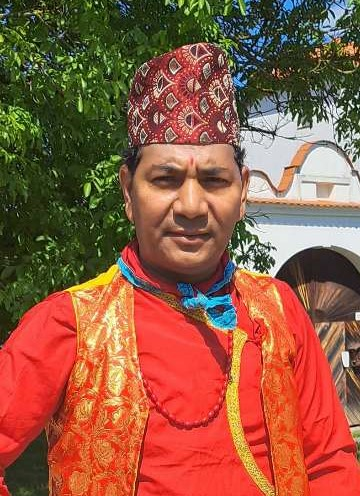
- Born: 9 November 1973 (age 53); Nepal
- Occupations: Dancer, choreographer

Shambhu Shahi (Nepali:शम्भु शाही) is a Nepalese dancer, a choreographer of Nepal. He started his international choreography journey in 2001 from Belgium and has performed in numerous European countries.

== Career ==
Shambhu Shahi is a Nepalese dancer and choreographer with a career spanning three decades. He has showcased his artistry in Nepal, India, and various other countries. He presents traditional and cultural dances, including Jhyaure, Gurung, Ghantu, Tamang Selos, Sherpa Dance, and other ethnic dances, complete with their respective costumes.

Apart from his work as a dancer and choreographer, Shambhu has also choreographed music videos. He started his choreography career from 2054 B.S. from Kunti Moktan's song. He has worked on choreography for music videos like "Timro Khushi Ko Lagi," "Ekantama Mayalu," "Kohi Jindagani" by Khem Raj Gurung, "Kholako Chiso Pani," and "Ko Bhrosa" by Kumar Kanchha.

He has been honored with prestigious awards, including the Star International Award 2021 and Sahara App Sagarmatha Music Award, among others.

== Songs ==
SN	Song name	ref
1	Timro Khusi ko Lagi	
2	Khoi Jindagi	
3	Jaadu Rahechh Bolima	
4	Hamro Jodi Hit	

== Awards ==
SN	Award	Ref.
1	Star International Music Awards	
2	Saharaapp Sagarmatha Music Awards	
